Joan Reventós i Carner (born 26 July 1927 in Barcelona; died 13 January 2004 in Barcelona) was the 10th President of the Parliament of Catalonia (1995–1999). He had previously been Minister without Portfolio, from 1977 to 1980. Reventós joined the PSUC in 1976 and the following year was elected to the Spanish national parliament as a deputy for Barcelona Province serving until 1980. He was the Spanish ambassador to France from 1983 to 1986.

References

1927 births
2004 deaths
Socialists' Party of Catalonia politicians
Presidents of the Parliament of Catalonia
Politicians from Barcelona
Members of the constituent Congress of Deputies (Spain)
Members of the 1st Congress of Deputies (Spain)
Ambassadors of Spain to France
Members of the 5th Parliament of Catalonia